OpenGov is a government technology company that offers cloud software for public sector accounting, planning, budgeting, citizen services, and procurement. OpenGov serves over 1,000 cities, counties, and state agencies across 49 states. In April 2020, OpenGov released a full-cloud enterprise resource planning (ERP) system designed specifically for municipal and county governments.

History
OpenGov, which is headquartered in Silicon Valley, was founded in 2012 by Nate Levine, Dakin Sloss, Joe Lonsdale, and Zachary Bookman in response to the 2008 financial crisis. The company's founders and several advisors met while working with California Common Sense, a non-profit non-partisan organization, which advocates for open data and open government principles. The group founded OpenGov with the long-term goal of bringing a modern cloud ERP to local and state governments.

In April 2016, OpenGov acquired Ontodia, a leading developer of Open data CKAN, allowing OpenGov to expand its Reporting & Transparency suite.

In October 2017, OpenGov acquired government-serving tech company, Peak Democracy of Berkeley, California, to expand its public engagement, communication, and feedback tools.

In September 2019, OpenGov acquired ViewPoint Cloud, a platform used by city and state governments to manage community development operations, such as permitting, licensing, inspections, and code enforcement.

In April 2020, OpenGov launched the first fully-integrated cloud ERP designed specifically for local government, which consists of a fully-integrated Reporting & Transparency Platform as well as three comprehensive software suites: Budgeting & Planning, Accounting, Financial Management, and Citizen Services.

In October 2020, OpenGov acquired ClearRec, a Texas-based company, to incorporate its step-by-step bank reconciliation process technology into the OpenGov ERP Cloud.

In June 2021, OpenGov acquired ProcureNow to enable its customers to run budgeting, procurement and financial operations through the same vendor.

In April 2021, OpenGov announced the opening of its office location in Milwaukee, Wisconsin, making it the company's sixth company location in the country and its second in the Midwest.

OpenGov was included in the Forbes list of America's Best Startup Employers 2021. OpenGov was included in Energage's 2021 Top Workplaces USA within the Tech Industry.

In July 2022, OpenGov acquired Cartegraph, a public cloud software developer, with funding from Cox Enterprises.

Campaigns 
On September 15, 2021, OpenGov announced its "Across America" campaign. As a part of the campaign, the company's CEO, Zac Bookman, embarked on a 4,000-mile cross-country biking tour, stopping along the way to thank local leadership. In support of this campaign, OpenGov also partnered up with Sandra Day O'Connor Institute to increase awareness for civic engagement and civil discourse, among other goals.

Customers
As of April 2020, OpenGov serves 1,000 government entities, including state agencies, city governments, school districts, and other special districts.

Municipalities 
The City of Palo Alto was OpenGov's first customer, following a collaboration between the city and employees from nonprofit California Common Sense to launch a comprehensive open data platform.

Other notable municipality customers include Minneapolis, MN, San Antonio, TX, Richmond, VA, Tampa, FL, Savannah, GA, St. Petersburg, FL, Stamford, CT, Scranton, PA, Chapel Hill, NC, Oakland, CA, Topeka, KS, Lubbock, TX, San Antonio, TX, and Tucson, AZ.

In October 2019, the city of Plattsburgh, New York, signed a seven-year deal with OpenGov to use OpenGov's budgeting software. Despite being a seven-year deal, the contract can be terminated within 90 days of notice. OpenGov will charge the city of Plattsburgh a one-time start-up fee of $4,000 followed by an annual charge of $18,000.

Following a chain of cyberattacks and scandals, the city of Scranton, Pennsylvania, partnered up with OpenGov to use its cloud based ERP to restore public trust, improve safety, and accelerate the city's operations. The City's Business Administrator, Karl Deeley, stated that Scranton's operations had not undergone any major changes since the 1980s, so its partnership with OpenGov will enable the city to decrease resiliency on its old infrastructure.

In September 2021, the municipality of Durango, Colorado, announced its partnership with OpenGov to increase transparency with its citizens by allowing them to view the city's finances, as well as the spending of other government entities, real time. The effort to increase transparency came after Durango's former finance director, Julie Brown, was caught embezzling over $700,000 across 11 years. Durango also lost millions of dollars through clerical errors in 2019, which OpenGov's software could reduce and prevent down the road.

Counties 
Notable county customers of OpenGov include Dallas County, TX, Middlesex County, NJ, Montgomery County, PA, Denton County, TX, Maui County, HI, Delaware County, OH, and Suffolk County, NY.

In June 2021, Crook County, Oregon, joined OpenGov's list of clients when it started to use OpenGov's budget and financing software, enabling residents to interact with the budget. Crook County's budgeting was done by a small team, so the county decided to automate its budgeting process through OpenGov, improving the efficiency and the effectiveness of the budgeting process.

States 
In 2019, the State of West Virginia partnered with OpenGov to launch statewide financial reporting between the State and West Virginia municipalities, after having launched a transparency initiative with OpenGov in the previous year.

In 2020, the State of Idaho Controller's Office, which had already used OpenGov software to improve fiscal transparency, began using OpenGov to manage CARES Act grant funding due to the COVID-19 crisis.

Schools and Special Districts 
Notable OpenGov school and special district customers include the Menlo Park City School District, Cal Poly San Luis Obispo, Loudoun County Public Schools, VA, Cincinnati Public Schools, OH, Northern Virginia Regional Park Authority, VA, and the Jackson County Water and Sewerage Authority in Georgia.

Companies 
On January 11, 2021, OpenGov announced its partnership with Fyllo, a cannabis compliance software company, to streamline the ability of local municipalities to not only write and approve new cannabis regulations, but to also create a thorough compliance tracking solution. This comes in response to Fyllo's report of an increase of 55% in the number of government meetings about marijuana regulation throughout the U.S. Cannabis legislation provides a new source of income for many local governments, so OpenGov and Fyllo will be working with local governments to allow "government officials to easily track regulations and policies tied to these processes to ensure that municipalities are compliant with state and federal law."

Advisors
OpenGov is advised by experts from the technology, financial, and public service sectors. Examples include:
Adrian Fenty, Mayor of Washington D.C. from 2007 to 2011
Lawrence H. Summers, Former U.S. Secretary of the Treasury
Pierre Lamond, venture capitalist
Byron Dorgan, Former U.S. Senator from North Dakota
Karen White, CEO of RMS 
Maury Blackman, President & CEO of Premise

Funding
OpenGov has raised $128 million from venture capital and angel investors. A$3 million Series A round in 2012 included venture funds 8VC, Founder Collective, Valiant Capital, and "a number of high-profile angel investors." In 2013, the company raised $4 million in further investment from 8VC and new investor Thrive Capital.

On May 15, 2014, OpenGov announced a new $15 million Series B round of funding including investments from Andreessen Horowitz, 8VC, Group 11, Streamlined Ventures, Sway Ventures, and Thrive Capital.

An additional $25 million Series B round in October 2015 included additional investments from Andreessen Horowitz, 8VC, Thrive Capital, and Sway Ventures, as well as new investors Glynn Capital, Scott Cook, and Ashton Kutcher and Guy Oseary’s Sound Ventures. Marc Andreessen was also added to the board during the October 15, 2015, round.

In May 2017, the company raised $30 million in a Series C founding round and in September 2019, the startup picked up an additional $51 million in a Series D round led by Weatherford Capital and 8VC (Lonsdale's investment firm), with participation from existing investor Andreessen Horowitz.

In mid-August 2021, Weatherford Capital, a private investment firm in Florida, closed nearly $355 million in its first round of investments for the government technology space, with OpenGov being one of the multiple civic technology companies that received a portion of the investments.

See also
Accountability
e-democracy
e-government
Freedom of information legislation
Public trust
Open government data
Transparency
Government budget
Fund accounting

References

Software companies based in California
Financial software companies
Companies based in Mountain View, California
Web applications
Software companies of the United States